P. Chacko Joseph (P. C. Joseph) is a member of Janadhipathya Kerala Congress, one of the main factions of the Kerala Congress, a party born in Central Travancore or Central South Kerala region focusing on the interest of Kerala farmers. He was a member of the Kerala Legislature (Niyamasabha Mandiram), representing the Muvattupuzha constituency of Kerala.

P. C. Joseph is the Son of Shri Chacko and Smt. Mariama.

References

External links
 Facebook
 Election 2016

Living people
1949 births
Malayali politicians
Syro-Malabar Catholics
People from Idukki district